Great Britain women's junior national softball team is the junior national under-17 team for Great Britain. The team competed at the 2013 ISF Junior Women's World Championship in Brampton, Ontario where they finished ninth.

References

External links 
 International Softball Federation

Women's national under-18 softball teams
Softball in the United Kingdom
Softball